John Peter Bollons  (10 November 1862 – 18 September 1929) was a New Zealand marine captain, naturalist and ethnographer. For many years he captained New Zealand government steamers, including the NZGSS Hinemoa, which undertook lighthouse work and patrols through New Zealand's  subantarctic islands. Bollons Island, in the Antipodes Islands, is named after him. In 1928 he was appointed a Companion of the Imperial Service Order.

Personal life
Bollons was born 10 November 1862 in Bethnal Green, England, the son of a London cab master. At 19, Bollons joined the crew of the barque England's Glory. After an eventful trip from the West Indies, the ship was wrecked at Bluff 1881, with no loss of life. Bollons and another young crew member were taken in by one of the local Māori families. He married Lilian Rose Hunter, the daughter of a master mariner, in 1896 in Invercargill.   In 1911, the family moved to Wellington. They had four daughters and four sons:  Thomas Tangaroa (b. 1896), John Tutanekai (b. 1897, Alan Awarua (b. 1900), Liliian Hinemoa (b. 1903), Desmond Maori (b. 1905), Kathleen Rawhiti (b. 1908), and Patricia Maimoa (b. 1909), and Nancy Awatea born 1914. Bollons died after developing pneumonia following hernia surgery  on 18 September 1929.  He is buried at Bluff, and a memorial was erected in All Saints' Church, Kilbirnie, which was unveiled by  Governor General Sir Charles Fergusson.

Marine career

Bollons went to sea at the age of 19, joining a barquentine en route to the West Indies.  In 1881, his ship England's Glory ran aground in Bluff; he settled in the town, working for a pilot cutter before gaining work on the government ketch Kekeno. From then until 1892 he served aboard a number of local and merchant vessels before gaining  his master's certificate, after which he worked on Marine Department steamers.  In 1898 he became captain of the Government Service Steamer Hinemoa.

The government steamers had various duties throughout New Zealand's waters, including supplying and supporting lighthouses, charting the coasts, patrolling and replenishing castaway depots in the subantantarctic islands – as well as searching for lost vessels – and carrying scientific and navigational parties. As part of these duties, he rescued castaways from the Anjou on Auckland Island, 1905, and the Dundonald on Disappointment Island in 1907.

In 1908, Bollons surveyed and selected the site for the Cape Brett Lighthouse.

Natural history and ethnography interests
Bollons had a great interest in natural history, collecting various specimens on his journeys. He corresponded regularly with natural environment scientists and sometimes collected specimens for them. The rescue of the castaways of the Dundonald coincided with the 1907 Sub-Antarctic Islands Scientific Expedition whose participants were travelling on the Hinemoa. He was very well regarded by the members of the Expedition as he regularly pointed out and ensured they visited areas he was familiar with and thought might interest them. One of the participants of the expedition – a botanist called Dr Leonard Cockayne latter named a plant after Bollons – the Veronica bollonsii. In 1946 Mrs Bollons donated an album of photographs to the Alexander Turnbull Library; the album comprised photographs taken by Samuel Page on the Hinemoa's 1907 scientific expedition to the subantarctic islands, and had been given to Captain Bollons by the members of the expedition. In the 1928 King's Birthday Honours, Bollons was appointed a Companion of the Imperial Service Order; the award was given on retirement to the administration and clerical staff of the Civil Service throughout the British Empire for long and meritorious service.

Bollons was also highly interested in Māori culture, especially fishing traditions. He often used his voyages around the New Zealand coastline and islands to conduct fossicking trips. He spoke Te Reo and the love of this language was reflected in the fact that all of his children had Māori middle names. He collected a large number of Māori and Pacific artifacts and natural environment specimens. The Bollons Collection was purchased by the Dominion Museum. from his widow in 1931. The museum also holds collections of shells, birds and also a valuable collection of New Zealand bird eggs collected by Bollons.

Bollons' reputation as an amateur ornithologist was widespread, and he donated a number of eggs to the American Museum of Vertebrate Zoology in 1923, and provided significant information on the breeding practices of albatrosses.

In fiction
Bollons was the subject of Captain John Niven, a fictionalised biography by Bernard Fergusson, who lived in New Zealand for a time when his father served as Governor-General.

See also
List of natural history dealers

References

External links
New Zealand Electronic Text Centre: Mr. John Bollons
New Zealand Electronic Text Centre: The 1907 expedition to the Auckland and Campbell Islands
The wreck of England's Glory

New Zealand Companions of the Imperial Service Order
New Zealand sailors
New Zealand ornithologists
Ethnographers
Sea captains
1862 births
1929 deaths
Natural history collectors
People from Bethnal Green
New Zealand naturalists